Shahr-e Khas (also Romanized as Shahr-e Khāş and Shahr Khas; also known as Pālāīshgāh-ye Valī ʿAṣr) is a village in Kuri Rural District, in the Central District of Jam County, Bushehr Province, Iran. At the 2006 census, its population was 562, in 123 families.

References 

Populated places in Jam County